Aye or AYE may refer to:

 Aye (yes), a word for expressing the affirmative
 Aye (village), a village in Belgium
 Aye (album), by Martyn Bennett, 2012
 "Aye" (song), by Davido, 2014

Abbreviations and acronyms
 Africa's Young Entrepreneurs,  a non-profit organisation in Johannesburg, South Africa
 Allegheny Energy (NYSE symbol), an electric utility in Greensburg, Pennsylvania, US
 Ayer Rajah Expressway (abbreviated AYE), a road in Singapore

People
 Saint Aye (died c. 711), Belgian Catholic saint
 Florian Ayé (born 1997), French footballer
 G. Kaito Aye, Indian politician
 Mar Mar Aye (born 1942), Burmese singer
 Marion Aye (1903–1951), American actress
 Maung Aye (born 1938), Burmese military officer
 Mya Aye (activist) (born 1966), Burmese pro-democracy activist
 Mya Aye (minister) (1942–2013), Burmese educator and government minister
 Mya Aye (golfer) (born 1940), Burmese golfer
 Sithu Aye (born 1990), Scottish-Burmese musician

See also
 AEY (disambiguation)
 Aye-aye, a lemur
 AY (disambiguation)
 Eye (disambiguation)
 Yes (disambiguation)
 Right (disambiguation)

Burmese-language surnames
Surnames of Burmese origin